Nasrabad (also Romanized as Naşrābād; also known as Nasīrābād) is a village in Ahmadabad Rural District, Hasanabad District, Eqlid County, Fars Province, Iran. At the 2006 census, its population was 182, in 45 families.

References 

Populated places in Eqlid County